John Alexander Watt (1868–1958) was an Australian geologist and mineralogist and participant of the 1894 Horn Expedition to Central Australia. Born in Parramatta, New South Wales, Watt graduated from the University of Sydney. He died in Tenterfield.

References

1868 births
1958 deaths
Australian geologists
Australian mineralogists
People from Parramatta
University of Sydney alumni